During the 2001–02 season A.C. Fiorentina competed in Serie A, Coppa Italia and UEFA Cup.

Summary 
Associazione Calcio Fiorentina endured a nightmare season, which proved to be the last for the initial club. The economy was in tatters, and despite the €40 million sale of playmaker Rui Costa, the financial problems just got worse as the season lingered on. Without Rui Costa and vital goalkeeper Francesco Toldo, the remainder of the Fiorentina squad was exposed when striker Enrico Chiesa ruptured his cruciate ligament in the fifth league game of the season.

The ageing defenders had no chance against the strikers of the opposing teams, and the off-pitch trouble clearly affected the performance of some well-known players including Domenico Morfeo and Nuno Gomes. Not even superstarlet Adriano, loaned in from Inter, could save the team, even though the Brazilian scored six goals.

Manager Roberto Mancini was sacked, before joining Lazio and turning his managerial career around. The club was relegated, and filed for bankruptcy in the summer, ensuring the club had to restart in Serie C2 as Florentia Viola. All players bar veteran Angelo Di Livio departed the club, and the remainder of the club was just in ashes.

Despite the weak performance of the club, several of its players were hired by illustrious clubs, including:

 Emiliano Moretti (Juventus)
 Enrico Chiesa (Lazio)
 Roberto Baronio (Lazio)
 Nuno Gomes (Benfica)
 Domenico Morfeo (Inter)
 Daniele Adani (Inter)
 Moreno Torricelli (Espanyol)
 Paolo Vanoli (Bologna)

Kit 
Supplier: Mizuno / Sponsor: Toyota

Players

Transfers

Winter

Competitions

Supercoppa Italiana

Serie A

League table

Results summary

Results by round

Matches

Coppa Italia

Second stage

UEFA Cup

First round

Second round

Third round

Statistics

Goalscorers 
  Adriano 6
  Enrico Chiesa 5
  Nuno Gomes 4

References 

ACF Fiorentina seasons
Fiorentina